Isopogon dawsonii, commonly known as the Nepean conebush, is a shrub of the family Proteaceae and is endemic eastern to New South Wales. It has pinnate leaves with narrow segments and spherical heads of creamy yellow to greyish white flowers.

Description
The branches are reddish brown, the branchlets and leaves covered with greyish hairs when young.

Taxonomy and naming
Isopogon dawsonii was first formally described in 1895 by R.T. Baker in Proceedings of the Linnean Society of New South Wales from an unpublished manuscript by Ferdinand von Mueller. The specific epithet (dawsonii) honours James Dawson of Rylstone.

Distribution and habitat
Nepean conebush occurs naturally on sandstone slopes and near cliff edges in heathland and dry sclerophyll forest in the valleys of the Goulburn and Nepean Rivers, on the Central Coast, the Central Tablelands and the Western Slopes down to Lithgow.

Use in horticulture
This isopogon can be grown from seed or from cuttings of firm new growth. It will grow in a range of conditions and is drought and frost hardy. It has been used as rootstock for some Western Australian species of isopogon.

References

dawsonii
Flora of New South Wales
Taxa named by Richard Thomas Baker
Plants described in 1895
Taxa named by Ferdinand von Mueller